Glennville may refer to:

 Glennville, California
 Glennville, Georgia
 Glennville, Pennsylvania, a place in Chester County

See also
Glenville (disambiguation)
Glenvil, Nebraska
Glenvil Township, Clay County, Nebraska